Costică Ștefănescu (26 March 1951 – 20 August 2013) was a Romanian football player and coach who last managed Qatari side Al Shamal. He spent the majority of his career at CS Universitatea Craiova, where he made a club record 378 appearances. He is also the second all-time appearance leader in Liga I, having played in a total of 490 matches. In 1983, Ștefănescu was nominated for the Ballon d'Or. In August 2013, after suffering from cancer for a long time, he committed suicide by jumping from the fifth floor of the military hospital in Bucharest.

Honours

Player
Steaua Bucharest
Cupa României: 1969–70, 1970–71
Universitatea Craiova
Liga I: 1973–74, 1979–80, 1980–81
Cupa României:  1976–77, 1977–78, 1980–81, 1982–83

Coach
Al-Wakrah
Qatar Sheikh Jassem Cup: 1991
Al-Jaish
Syrian Cup: 2004
AFC Cup: 2004

Notes

References

External links

1951 births
Romanian footballers
Romanian football managers
Olympic footballers of Romania
Romania international footballers
Liga I players
FC Steaua București players
FC Steaua București managers
FC Astra Giurgiu managers
CSM Reșița managers
FC Brașov (1936) players
CS Universitatea Craiova players
UEFA Euro 1984 players
Expatriate football managers in Israel
Expatriate football managers in Kuwait
Expatriate football managers in Qatar
Expatriate football managers in Syria
Expatriate football managers in Saudi Arabia
Al-Wakrah SC managers
Al-Shamal SC managers
Romanian expatriate sportspeople in Kuwait
Romanian expatriate sportspeople in Qatar
Romanian expatriate football managers
Najran SC managers
Suicides by jumping in Romania
FC Brașov (1936) managers
FCM Bacău managers
Association football central defenders
2013 suicides
Al Tadhamon SC managers
Kuwait Premier League managers
Saudi Professional League managers
Romanian expatriate sportspeople in Saudi Arabia
Romanian expatriate sportspeople in Syria
Al-Wahda SC (Syria) managers
Al-Jaish Damascus managers
AFC Cup winning managers